The 1960–61 Bulgarian Hockey League season was the ninth season of the Bulgarian Hockey League, the top level of ice hockey in Bulgaria. 10 teams participated in the league, and Cerveno Zname Sofia won the championship.

Standings

External links
 Season on hockeyarchives.info

Bul
1960
Bulg